Agrotis epicremna is a moth of the family Noctuidae. It is endemic to Kauai, Molokai, Maui and East Maui.

The larvae are thought to feed on Argyroxiphium species.

External links
Organisms of Hawaii

Agrotis
Endemic moths of Hawaii
Moths described in 1899